Toddington could be

Toddington, Bedfordshire
Toddington services, M1 motorway
Toddington, Gloucestershire
Toddington railway station
Toddington, West Sussex